Branco River a principal affluent of the Rio Negro in South America.

Branco River (English: White River) may also refer to rivers in Brazil and Bolivia:
 Branco ou Cabixi River
 Branco River (Acre)
 Branco River (Aripuanã River)
 Branco River (Bahia)
 Branco River (Guaporé River)
 Branco River (Jaciparaná River)
 Branco River (Jamari River)
 Branco River (Mato Grosso do Sul)
 Branco River (Pará)
 Branco River (Paraná)
 Branco River (Roosevelt River)
 Branco River (São Paulo)

See also
 
 Rio Branco (disambiguation)